Pavlos Pavlidis (died 1968) was a Greek sport shooter. He competed at the 1896 Summer Olympics in Athens.

Pavlidis placed second in the military rifle competition with a score of 1,978. He had hit the target 38 times out of forty shots, trailing the champion Pantelis Karasevdas by two hits and 372 points.

Pavlidis also competed in the free rifle and military pistol competitions, though his score and place in those events are unknown except that he did not finish in the top five in either.

References

External links

Year of birth missing
1968 deaths
Greek male sport shooters
Olympic shooters of Greece
Olympic silver medalists for Greece
Shooters at the 1896 Summer Olympics
19th-century sportsmen
Olympic medalists in shooting
Medalists at the 1896 Summer Olympics
Date of death missing
Place of birth missing
Place of death missing